Fengshun (postal: Fungshun or Pungshan) is a county in Meizhou City, in the east of Guangdong Province, southern China.

Ethno-linguistic make-up

Fengshun is noted for its large Hakka population.

Administrative divisions
Fengshun County's executive, legislature and judiciary are based in Tangkeng, along with its CPC and PSB branches. The county is responsible for the administration of 16 towns and one Township Enterprise.

Towns

Baxiangshan 
Beidou 
Dalonghua 
Fengliang 
Huangjin 
Jianqiao 
Liuhuang 
Longgang 
Pantian 
Puzhai 
Shatian 
Tanjiang 
Tangkeng 
Tangnan 
Tangxi 
Xiaosheng

Township enterprise
 Puzhai Farm

Transport
The area is served by Fengshun railway station on the Guangzhou–Meizhou–Shantou railway and Fengshun East railway station on the Meizhou–Chaoshan high-speed railway.

Climate

References

External links
 Fengshun government website (丰顺镇人民政府)

 
1927 in China
County-level divisions of Guangdong
Meizhou